Volusia Speedway Park (formerly known as Volusia County Speedway and Barberville Speedway) is an auto racing facility located near Barberville in Volusia County, Florida. 

It currently operates as a 1/2-mile dirt oval and a 1/5-mile dirt oval for karts. 

The track currently hosts races from the World of Outlaws series (both sprints and late models) and the UMP late model series, As well as the UMP Super DIRTcar Series (Both big-block and small block modified racing). 

The track was built by Benny Corbin and opened in 1968 as a 1/4 mile dirt oval, operating through 1969. It expanded to 3/8 mile (still dirt) in August 1969, operating through 1971. 

It was expanded again to 1/2 mile in February 1972. Dick Murphy bought the racetrack in 1982, and paved it in 1989. Murphy sold it in 1992, and re-purchased it in 1997, when it was converted back to dirt.

The NASCAR Southeast Series had run nine races in the complex between 1991 and 1998, the first eight events were on the 1/2 mile paved track. The last event, in 1998, was on the 3/8 mile recently paved oval but since it was converted back into dirt for 1999, the track was removed from Southeast schedule.

The 3/8 mile dirt oval opened behind turn four of the original oval, operating from 1993 until it was paved in 1998 for a NASCAR Southeast Series event, but in 1999 it was converted back into dirt. In late 2004 the paved surface was torn up and removed and the karting track that was located inside of the asphalt track was redesigned and took over all of the former track.

The 1/5 mile dirt karting track complex is known as "Volusia Karting".

Murphy sold the racetrack in 2005 to DIRT Motorsports, later renamed the "World Racing Group".

In 2021, Daytona Beach Bike Week flat track events, sanctioned by American Flat Track, moved from Daytona to Volusia Speedway Park.  In 2022, American Flat Track will add a Biketoberfest race at Volusia.

NASCAR events
From 1989 until 1992, the track hosted a NASCAR Busch Series race on the 1/2 mile layout.

References

External links

Official site
DIRTcar Nationals at Volusia Speedway Park
Volusia Speedway Park race results at Racing-Reference

Motorsport venues in Florida
Sports venues in Volusia County, Florida
NASCAR tracks
1968 establishments in Florida
Sports venues completed in 1968